Kankossa is a department of Assaba Region in Mauritania.

List of municipalities in the department 
The Kankossa department is made up of following municipalities:

 Blajmil
 Hamod
 Kankossa
 Sani
 Tenaha.

In 2000, the entire population of the Kankossa Department has a total of 63 064 inhabitants  (30 485 men and 32 579 women).

References 

Departments of Mauritania